Mário Pereira Lopes State Airport  is the airport serving São Carlos, Brazil.

It is operated by Rede Voa.

History 
The airport was built in the 1970s as a private aerodrome of a Brazilian tractor manufacturer. In 1995 the factory went bankrupt and, as a consequence, its administration was taken over by DAESP in 2001. DAESP renovated and modernized all facilities.

On December 1, 1997 the facility was internationalized albeit with restrictions: only maintenance ferry flights are permitted with previous arrangements set with the National Civil Aviation Agency of Brazil. 

Taking advantage of its international status TAM Airlines (now LATAM Brasil) acquired the old tractor plant and after a complete renovation installed one of its maintenance centers on the site. This facility provides services to not only LATAM but also other airlines. 

In 2002, with the closure of the former São Carlos Airport , which was closer to town, the resident São Carlos Aero Club was transferred to Mário Pereira Lopes Airport.

Close to the maintenance center was located the TAM Museum which housed a big collection of vintage aircraft. On February 2, 2016 the museum was closed and on May 18, 2018 it was announced that it would be relocated close to the Brazilian Aerospace Memorial at São José dos Campos Airport, near the Embraer plant.

Previously operated by DAESP, on July 15, 2021 the concession of the airport was auctioned to Rede Voa.

Airlines and destinations 
No scheduled flights operate at this airport.

Access 

See also 

 List of airports in Brazil

References

External links 
 
 
 

Airports in São Paulo (state)
Airports established in 1972
São Carlos
1972 establishments in Brazil